The Jeep Recon is a battery electric mid-size SUV set to be produced by Jeep in 2024. Revealed in a set of images in September 2022 alongside two other Jeep models, it is an off-road-oriented SUV that is heavily inspired by the Wrangler, and will be sold alongside it. The Recon name was previously used for a variant of the Wrangler.

It is based on the STLA Large platform, with fully independent suspension. The vehicle will have removable doors, retractable roof, electronic locking differentials, Selec-Terrain traction management functions, skid plates, tow hooks, off-road-rated tires, and underbody protection. It will be produced in the United States and will be available for the global market.

References

External links

 Official press release

Cars introduced in 2022
Recon
Mid-size sport utility vehicles
All-wheel-drive vehicles
Convertibles
Motor vehicles manufactured in the United States
Electric concept cars
Upcoming car models